Messing is a surname:

People
 Asher Messing (born 1947), Israeli former football manager
 Debra Messing (born 1968), American actress
 Jerry Messing (born 1986), American actor
 Joachim Messing (1946–2019), American biologist
 Keegan Messing (born 1992), American figure skater
 Roy Messing (born 1958), American former soccer goalkeeper
 Shep Messing (born 1949), American former soccer player
 Stanislav Messing, full name Stanislav Adamovich Messing, (1890, Warsaw - September 2, 1937, Moscow), served as a Soviet party and state functionary, and as one of the leaders of the Soviet state security and intelligence bodies. Member of the Central Control Commission of the CPSU(b) between 1930 and 1934.
 Susan Messing (born 1963), American actress, comedian and author
 Ulrica Messing (born 1968), Swedish former politician
 William Messing, American mathematician
 Wolf Messing (1899–1974), Russian alleged psychic and telepathist

Jewish surnames
Yiddish-language surnames